Anișoara Matei (born 16 August 1951) is a Romanian sports shooter. She competed in two events at the 1988 Summer Olympics.

References

1951 births
Living people
Romanian female sport shooters
Olympic shooters of Romania
Shooters at the 1988 Summer Olympics
People from Ilfov County